Baisha Subdistrict is a subdistrict in Meilan District, Haikou, Hainan, China. , it has 4 residential communities under its administration.

See also 
 List of township-level divisions of Hainan

References 

Township-level divisions of Hainan
Haikou